Don Quixote Returns is a 1997 Russian-Bulgarian comedy film directed by Vasily Livanov.

Plot 
The film tells a funny, but at the same time sad story of the famous Don Quixote, which can make you think about life.

Cast 
 Armen Dzhigarkhanyan as Sancho Panza
 Vasily Livanov as Don Quixote
 Valentin Smirnitsky as Padre Perez
 Tzvetana Maneva as Donna Teresa
 Stefan Danailov as Duke
 Stoyan Aleksiev as Nicholas
 Kalin Arsov
 Inna Assa as Young actress
 Lyudmila Cheshmedzhieva
 Velina Doichinova as Antonia

References

External links 
 

1997 films
Russian comedy films
1990s Russian-language films
Films scored by Gennady Gladkov
Films based on Don Quixote
1997 comedy films